The Orion I was a line of rigid high-floor transit buses made in 30-, 35-, and 40-foot lengths by Ontario Bus & Truck (renamed to Ontario Bus Industries (OBI) in 1977) between 1976 and 1993 for the Canadian and United States mass transportation markets. The Orion I was the first bus offered by OBI and was available in transit (2-door) and coach/suburban (1-door) models. It was replaced by the rigid Orion V (introduced in 1989) and low-floor Orion VI (introduced in 1993).

A licensed version of the 30-foot model was produced by Transportation Manufacturing Corporation (TMC) as the T-30 Citycruiser from 1979 to 1982.

Design 
The bus was available in both transit (two-door) and suburban (single front door) configurations; in addition, OBI used the Orion I to produce an ambulance and a motorhome. It uses a welded monocoque steel tube frame clad with steel panels. Although a prototype was produced in 1976, serial production did not begin until 1978. The 30-foot Orion I filled the "medium" transit bus segment left vacant by the withdrawal of the 30-foot GM New Look (discontinued in 1974) and Flxible New Look buses (discontinued in 1976); by 1982, TMC (a licensee of the Orion I design) was dominating the U.S. market for medium transit buses, alongside Blue Bird Corporation's City Bird.

OBI marketed the Orion I to both the Canadian and United States transit markets. Canadian buses were assembled at the OBI plant in Mississauga, Ontario. For the US market, to meet 'Buy America' requirements for federally subsidized transit vehicles, the Orion I was initially produced under license before OBI incorporated the wholly owned subsidiary Bus Industries of America (BIA) in 1981 to assemble the Orion I in Oriskany, New York.

Eventually OBI began producing larger Orion I buses, introducing a 35-foot model in 1979 and a 40-foot model in 1984.

Models 
Internally, OBI designated the bus model as 01.5xx, with xx denoting a combination of vehicle length and door configuration.

Citycruiser 

Transportation Manufacturing Corporation (TMC), a subsidiary of Greyhound Lines, began manufacturing buses in Roswell, New Mexico in 1975, producing approximately 450 per year to replace older suburban coaches for its parent company. Because Greyhound retired its coaches seasonally, production at TMC was inconsistent, and TMC acquired a license from OBI to produce the Citycruiser in 1979, ensuring that year-round work could be sustained. TMC unveiled its first Citycruiser on May 31, 1979, during dedication ceremonies for the new factory. The entire 1979 production had already been sold.

TMC sold its license back to OBI in 1981, and the last Citycruiser left Roswell in 1982. OBI, as BIA, subsequently assembled Orion I buses for the United States transit market in Oriskany, New York, starting production in June 1982.

CNG 

In 1988, two 40-foot Orion I buses were converted to run on compressed natural gas (CNG) by Brooklyn Union Gas Company and placed into express route service by Command Bus.

Deployment 
The Orion I was OBI's initial transit bus. Customers included many small transit agencies.

By 1984, more than 1,400 Orion I buses had been produced, including approximately 950 Citycruisers built under license by TMC. The Mississauga and Oriskany factories had a capacity of three and ten buses every two weeks, respectively.

Competition 
 Flxible New Look
 Flyer D700
 GM New Look bus
 Rapid Transit Series

References

External links 

 
 
 
 

Buses of Canada
Buses of the United States
Vehicles introduced in 1978